Change is the seventh solo album by guitarist/vocalist Richie Kotzen. Both "Change" and "Get A Life" appeared in Japanese commercials following their release. Kotzen wrote and produced this album.

Track listing

Personnel
Richie Kotzen – all instruments, composer, producer
Pat Torpey – drums (on "High", "Out Take")
Billy Sheehan – bass (on "Out Take")
Charlie Sarti – additional vocals (on "Fast Money Fast Cars")
Tom Baker – mastering
 Yngwie Malmsteen - composer
 Richie Zito - composer
 Takaomi Shibayama - artwork, design
 William Hames - photography

References

2003 albums
Richie Kotzen albums
Shrapnel Records albums